Geliy Mikhailovich Korzhev-Chuvelyov (7 July 1925 – 27 August 2012) was a Soviet and Russian painter.

Life 
He studied at Moscow State Art School from 1939 to 1944 under Vasily Pochitalov, Mikhail Dobroserdov, and Mikhail Barshch. From 1944 to 1950 he studied at the Moscow State Art Institute under Sergey Gerasimov and Vasily Pochitalov. A painter in Soviet approved style of socialist realism, he continued to be active after the dissolution of the Soviet Union and remained a supporter of Communism.

Politics 
Unwavering in his political views, in the late 1990s the artist refused a state award bestowed upon him by the government of the Russian Federation, and Korzhev wrote of his motives:
I was born in the Soviet Union and sincerely believed in the ideas and ideals of the time. Today, they are considered a historical mistake. Now Russia has a social system directly opposite to the one under which I, as an artist, was brought up. The acceptance of a state award would be equal to a confession of my hypocrisy throughout my artistic career. I request that you consider my refusal with due understanding.

Death
He died on August 27, 2012. He was buried at Alekseyevskoye Cemetery in Moscow. The monument on the grave was made by grandson Ivan under the sketches of the artist himself.

Gallery

References

External links

Works by Geliy Korzhev
Works by Geliy Korzhev
GeliyKorzhev on Artnet

1925 births
2012 deaths
20th-century Russian painters
21st-century Russian painters
Artists from Moscow
Full Members of the Russian Academy of Arts
Full Members of the USSR Academy of Arts
Members of the Supreme Soviet of the Russian Soviet Federative Socialist Republic, 1963–1967
Members of the Supreme Soviet of the Russian Soviet Federative Socialist Republic, 1975–1980
People's Artists of the RSFSR (visual arts)
People's Artists of the USSR (visual arts)
Recipients of the Order of Lenin
Recipients of the Order of the Red Banner of Labour
Recipients of the USSR State Prize
Socialist realist artists
Russian communists
Russian educators
Russian male painters
Soviet educators
Soviet painters